Gabriola Sands Provincial Park is a provincial park in British Columbia, Canada. The park includes Taylor Bay, Pilot Bay, a fielded area, and the Malaspina Galleries, an unusual rock formation that resembles a breaking wave. Exploration of the galleries has been prohibited since 2004 due to safety concerns, though they are still accessible along the shoreline.

The formation was named the "galleries" due to the proliferation of graffiti on the underside of the overhang. In 1999, the Parks Board sandblasted away the markings but the colloquial name remains.

External links

BC Geographical Names: Gabriola Sands Park

 

Regional District of Nanaimo
Provincial parks of British Columbia
Year of establishment missing